Artistenrevue is a 1926 Dutch silent comedy film directed by Alex Benno.

Cast
 Alex De Meester - Directeur
 Isodoor Zwaaf - Flipje
 Pauline de Munnik - (as Pauline Hervé)
 Cesarine Prinz - (as Césarine Speenhoff-Prinz)
 Marie Schafstad
 Stella Seemer
 Koos Speenhoff
 Aida de Beau Clair
 Matthieu van Eysden
 Adèle Boesnach

External links 
 

Dutch silent feature films
1926 films
Dutch black-and-white films
1926 comedy films
Films directed by Alex Benno
Dutch comedy films
Silent comedy films